PTE-2 may refer to one of two enzymes:
Choloyl-CoA hydrolase
Propanoyl-CoA C-acyltransferase